Marion Jeanne Caroline Maréchal (born Le Pen, 10 December 1989), known as Marion Maréchal-Le Pen from 2010 to 2018, is a French politician, part of the Le Pen family, granddaughter of National Front (renamed National Rally in 2018) founder Jean-Marie Le Pen and niece of its current leader Marine Le Pen.

She is a former member of the National Front and served as the member of the National Assembly for the 3rd constituency of Vaucluse from 2012 to 2017. Aged 22 years at the time of her election, she became France's youngest parliamentarian in modern political history. After the 2015 regional election, for which she received the best result for a FN candidate, she became the Leader of the Opposition in the Regional Council of Provence-Alpes-Côte d'Azur.

In 2017, she did not seek reelection as a member of the National Assembly and resigned as a regional councillor. She is currently involved in the education sector with her private school, the Institut des sciences sociales, économiques et politiques (ISSEP).

Family background
She was born on 10 December 1989 in Saint-Germain-en-Laye, Yvelines, Île-de-France.

Her grandfather, Jean-Marie Le Pen, founded the Front National party on 5 October 1972. Her aunt Marine Le Pen has been FN president since 16 January 2011, with Jean-Marie Le Pen first becoming honorary chairman and later excluded in August 2015. Her mother Yann Le Pen, Jean-Marie Le Pen's second daughter, does not carry out any official duties within the FN. Her father  was the leader of the Front National Youth movement (FNJ) for seven years (1992–1999). She featured with her grandfather in a campaign poster at the age of two.

In a book entitled The Conquerors (Les Conquérantes) launched on 18 November 2013, the French journalist Christine Clerc revealed that Samuel Maréchal is not her biological father. On 7 November 2013, the French weekly news magazine L'Express disclosed that her biological father was Roger Auque, a French diplomat and investigative journalist. On 8 November, Marion Maréchal-Le Pen announced that she was suing L'Express for a "serious invasion of her privacy". She won her case in April 2015.

Maréchal-Le Pen married businessman Matthieu Decosse on 29 July 2014, at the Saint-Cloud town hall. Their daughter was born that September. They divorced in 2016.

Maréchal-Le Pen became engaged to Italian politician Vincenzo Sofo in 2018. The couple married on September 11, 2021.

Academic studies
Until 2012, she was enrolled in Panthéon-Assas University's masters of public business law. On 14 November 2012, she wrote in an official statement that she had decided to put aside her studies in order to dedicate herself to her office.

After retiring from politics in 2017, Marion Marechal-Le Pen enrolled in a Master of Business Administration (MBA) at Emlyon Business School.

Political career 
About her early interest in politics, Maréchal-Le Pen explained: "Contrary to what everyone thinks, in my family we didn’t talk about politics at home and we were free to make our own choices. I became interested in politics around 15 or 16 and in various approaches, not necessarily FN". As a teenager she once attended a meeting addressed by Nicolas Sarkozy, "out of curiosity" because he "intrigued" her. She added: "I very quickly came down to earth." At the age of 18, she became a member of the FN.

Early career (2008–2010) 

She was a candidate in seventh position on the FN list in Saint-Cloud, Hauts-de-Seine, in the 2008 municipal elections. She was not elected, for the FN list only got 6.29% with one municipal councillor elected from the first round.

In the 2010 regional elections, she figured in second position on the FN departmental list in the Yvelines, Île-de-France. Marie-Christine Arnautu's FN list, which polled 9.29% in the whole of Île-de-France in the first round, could not take part in the run-off, given that a list must cross a threshold of 10% of the valid votes at a regional level. Because of the process of elimination, she was not elected in the Île-de-France's regional council.

National Assembly (2012–2017) 

Maréchal-Le Pen's parliamentary candidacy in Vaucluse's 3rd constituency was publicly confirmed on 25 April 2012, between the first round of the presidential election and its run-off. After her candidacy was made official by the FN nomination committee, she then campaigned in this constituency which includes the southern part of Carpentras. In the first round of the presidential elections, Marine Le Pen had achieved her highest national performance in Vaucluse (27.03%) and most notably in this constituency (31.50%) where she outdistanced the UMP incumbent president Nicolas Sarkozy (27.60%).

In the run-off on 17 June 2012, she defeated the incumbent MP Jean-Michel Ferrand, who had continuously sat in the National Assembly for twenty-six years (Rally for the Republic: 1986–2002, Union for a Popular Movement: 2002–2012). At the age of 22, she became the youngest person to enter the French Parliament in modern political history (Louis Antoine de Saint-Just, at 24 years old in 1791, was the previous youngest MP).

She and Gilbert Collard became the first members of the National Front to win seats in the National Assembly since 1997.

Rise within the FN (2012) 

In early July 2012 Maréchal-Le Pen became a member of the National Front's executive board. On 23 September 2012, she made her first public speech in front of 1,000 participants at the FN summer school in La Baule-Escoublac.

Local politics: Sorgues (2013–2014) 

During a press conference held on 30 October 2013, she officially announced her appearance as a fellow candidate on a municipal list at Sorgues, a town of 18,000 inhabitants located to the north of Avignon in the western part of her constituency. She decided to figure in tenth position on this local list led by Gérard Gérent, then an independent councillor belonging to the UMP municipal majority and a former deputy mayor of Sorgues.

In the first round of the 2012 presidential elections, Marine Le Pen had polled 36.02% at Sorgues whereas Marion Maréchal-Le Pen got there 37.65% in the first round and 44.36% in the run-off of the following legislative elections.

In the first round on 23 March 2014, the FN list led by Gérard Gérent, which was defeated by the one of the UMP incumbent mayor Thierry Lagneau, came second with 33.80% (2,861 votes) with the election of five municipal councillors and two community councillors. Consequently, she was not elected as a municipal councillor at Sorgues.

Regional candidacy in Provence-Alpes-Côte d'Azur (2015) 

In April 2015, Marion Maréchal-Le Pen was chosen by her party to be the leading FN candidate in the southeastern region of Provence-Alpes-Côte d’Azur in that year's regional elections, after her grandfather was expelled for his remarks on the Holocaust. She did not support his expulsion. The elections came a month after an Islamist terror attack which killed 130 people in Paris. Maréchal-Le Pen reacted on television by declaring that "Today, we can see that immigration has become favorable terrain for the development of Islamism".

In the first round of voting, she won 40.55% of the vote, becoming one of six FN candidates to lead a region. Socialist candidate Christophe Castaner then withdrew, to avoid splitting the vote for The Republicans' mayor of Nice, Christian Estrosi. In the second round of voting, no FN candidate won a region, with Maréchal-Le Pen losing to Estrosi by 54.78% to 45.22%. She received the best result for a National Front candidate, Marine Le Pen in comparison obtaining 42% in the Nord-Pas-de-Calais-Picardie region.

After politics 
In 2018, she founded the Institut des sciences sociales, économiques et politiques (ISSEP) in Lyon.

Between 2017 and 2019, she was seen as a potential candidate for the 2022 presidential election.

After a hiatus of two years from political life, Marion Maréchal appeared at a political convention in Paris on 28 September 2019 with right-wing political writer Éric Zemmour. The convention was part of an effort by members of the French far-right to unite the extreme and moderate wings of right-wing politics in France and develop a viable conservative candidacy for the 2022 French presidential election. Marion Maréchal has since become a leading figure of the Union of the Rights (l’Union des droites) project to form a unified conservative front in France.

Maréchal signed the Madrid Charter, a document drafted by the far-right Spanish party Vox that describes left-wing groups as enemies of Ibero-America involved in a "criminal project" that are "under the umbrella of the Cuban regime".

Re-entering politics 
Maréchal re-entered the political scene in March 2022, supporting the candidacy of Éric Zemmour in the 2022 French presidential election. She formalised her support for Zemmour at a large rally in Toulon on 6 March 2022, after a long period of speculation about her political future.

Political views 
 Maréchal-Le Pen's political, cultural and foreign policy views reflected the then consensus of the FN.

Social positions

Maréchal-Le Pen has stated that her party has supported the 'defense of the family' for a very long time. Along with Gilbert Collard and other FN senior executives, she took part in the mass demonstrations against same-sex marriage organized in Paris by La Manif pour tous movement in the first half of the year 2013.

Maréchal-Le Pen believes that Muslims can be French only if they follow the Christianity-shaped culture, saying that "In our country, we don't wear djellaba clothing, we don't wear a veil, and we don't impose cathedral-sized mosques".

She is opposed to the reinstatement of capital punishment: "In a private capacity, I am against the reinstatement of capital punishment, since this would impose an extremely difficult choice on judges. And whatever happens, the horrifying possibility of a miscarriage of justice is ever-present, no matter how minimally. I prefer the alternative of life imprisonment without the possibility of parole."

Academic Cécile Alduy described Maréchal-Le Pen as a "paradoxical character" who dresses and speaks in a modern way while promoting social conservatism. Conservative American former vice presidential candidate Sarah Palin praised Maréchal-Le Pen for her societal beliefs, and compared her to Joan of Arc. Former Counselor to the President and former executive chair of Breitbart News Steve Bannon also praised her, referring to her as "the new rising star"; afterwards Maréchal Le-Pen said on Twitter that she was willing to work with him.

Foreign policy and EU issues
Maréchal-Le Pen was a member of the France–Russia and France−Ivory Coast parliamentary friendship groups.

On 10 December 2012, Maréchal-Le Pen took part in an international parliamentary forum organized in Moscow by the State Duma. On 22 January 2013, she was present in the Reichstag at the commemoration of the fiftieth anniversary of the signing of the Élysée Treaty by French President Charles de Gaulle and German Chancellor Konrad Adenauer. In a written statement, she said that the treaty was originally based on the cooperation and partnership between two sovereign states and denounced the "forced march towards a German federal Europe".

On 29 September 2013, Maréchal-Le Pen attended a political event organized by the Vlaams Belang in Boom, near Antwerp. On this occasion, she explained: "It is important that a front of patriotic and euro-critical parties form in sight of European elections, which is the case, and get some good results in order to lead resistance to Euro and globalism".

Parliamentary career 
Along with Gilbert Collard, Maréchal-Le Pen introduced on 7 December 2012 a constitutional private member's bill concerning the appointment of the members of the Constitutional Council of France.

For the beginning of the fourteenth legislature, Maréchal-Le Pen cosigned four private member's bills including one constitutional forbidding marriage between same-sex persons and one organic which aims at enforcing the article 68 of the Constitution of France establishing a process of impeachment for the President of the Republic.

According to the rules of the National Assembly, an unregistered person sitting in Parliament can question the government orally every eight sessions. Maréchal-Le Pen asked three oral questions for the beginning of the legislature: in 2013, to Manuel Valls, Minister of the Interior about the policy regarding Romani people and to Marisol Touraine, Minister of Health and Social Affairs about the fight against welfare fraud; in 2014, to Nicole Bricq, Minister for Foreign Trade about the Transatlantic Trade and Investment Partnership.

In a written parliamentary question addressed in May 2013 to Valérie Fourneyron, Minister of Sports, Youth Affairs, Popular Education and Community life, Maréchal-Le Pen drew her attention to the poor treatment rugby league receives in France from the government and the media, regretting the banning of this sport during the Vichy regime.

In April 2015, because of his intense anti-FN campaign in the departmental elections, Maréchal-Le Pen criticized the "cretinous contempt" ("mépris crétin") of Socialist Prime Minister Manuel Valls in parliament, which appeared to fluster Valls. After it had become a viral video, Maréchal-Le Pen explained it was a reference to Michel Onfray, who had called Valls a "crétin" when the Prime Minister accused him of "losing his bearings".

Political committees 
 Member of the National Assembly for Vaucluse's 3rd constituency, 20 June 2012 – 20 June 2017 (14th legislature)
 Member of the standing committee for cultural affairs and education, 28 June 2012 – 30 September 2013 — Member of the standing committee on Foreign Affairs, 1 October 2013 – 20 June 2017
 Member of the study groups Heritage — Policies on rurality — Shale gas
 Member of the friendship groups France–Russia and France−Ivory Coast

One of the six youngest members of the new Assembly, Maréchal-Le Pen served on 26 June 2012 as a secretary during the opening of the fourteenth legislature presided over by the most senior member François Scellier.

Maréchal-Le Pen was a Non-Attached member of the National Assembly. Her seat (number 67) was located between the ones of Gilbert Collard (number 66, on her right) and Jacques Bompard (number 68, on her left). The National Assembly has included eight unregistered MPs since 30 August 2013.

References

External links

Institutional website
 National Assembly of France: profile and biography 
 National Assembly of France: activity report (2012–)

Complementary source 
 Interview with the French-speaking network ProRussia.tv 

1989 births
Living people
Paris 2 Panthéon-Assas University alumni
Emlyon Business School alumni
National Rally (France) politicians
Women members of the National Assembly (France)
French people of Breton descent
People from Saint-Germain-en-Laye
People from Yvelines
University of Paris alumni
French Roman Catholics
Le Pen family
Deputies of the 14th National Assembly of the French Fifth Republic
21st-century French women politicians
Signers of the Madrid Charter
Regional councillors of France
Reconquête politicians